The Mechanism for Cooperation and Verification (CVM) is a safeguard measure invoked by the European Commission when a new member or acceding state of the European Union has failed to implement commitments undertaken in the context of the accession negotiations in the fields of the Area of freedom, security and justice or internal market policy.

Background
Common practice in the EU is that during accession negotiations there are agreed some temporary transitional periods after accession of new states for derogation of application for specific parts of the acquis communautaire, because of difficulties either for the new member state (like environmental regulations for large combustion plants) or for the old member states (like free movement of workers). Such temporary transitional periods in regard to particular member states are also implemented when various new pieces of EU legislation are adopted .

In some cases the derogation is not temporary but permanent. Such derogations can be either major opt-outs in the European Union (formulated in a treaty) or minor derogations like the exemption of Sweden from the snus ban (formulated in EU legislation).

Both opt-outs and CVMs suspend the application of relevant provisions of EU law in regard to particular member states, but in contrast to opt-outs, which are established on the initiative of the states concerned, CVMs are established on the initiative of the commission.

In contrast to temporary derogations, which are automatically discontinued after the end of the transitional period, the Mechanism for Cooperation and Verification is permanent, and its discontinuation is conditional only on the positive assessment of the fulfilment of benchmarks in the regular reports issued by the European Commission. That is similar to the permanent derogations on Eurozone and Schengen Area for new member states (formulated in accession treaties), whose discontinuation is also conditional on fulfilling benchmarks (like the convergence criteria), which are similarly assessed in regular progress reports. According to the treaties, new member states are obliged to fulfill the benchmarks for discontinuation of both permanent derogations and CVMs, but some of them deliberately delay those processes. The CVM is thus different from the Enhanced co-operation mechanism in which all EU members are generally free to opt in at any time into an already-established enhanced co-operation initiative, without preconditions.

Legal base
The accession treaties include provisions such as:

Implementation

The internal market safeguard clause has not been invoked so far. The safeguard clause for criminal law and civil matters was invoked  in regard to the countries of the 2007 enlargement.

On 13 December 2006 the commission established the following mechanisms for cooperation and verification of progress:
 for Romania to address specific benchmarks in the areas of judicial reform and the fight against corruption
 for Bulgaria to address specific benchmarks in the areas of judicial reform and the fight against corruption and organised crime

These measures entered into force as of the first day of accession, 1.1.2007.

The Commission assessed that "When they joined the EU on 1 January 2007, Romania and Bulgaria still had progress to make in the fields of judicial reform, corruption and organised crime. To smooth the entry of both countries and at the same time safeguard the workings of its policies and institutions, the EU decided to establish a special "cooperation and verification mechanism" to help them address these outstanding shortcomings."

The Commission issues reports under the Cooperation and Verification Mechanism every 6 months on progress with judicial reform, the fight against corruption and, concerning Bulgaria, the fight against organised crime.

So far, no suspensions are enforced, but the possibility for those is stated in paragraph 7 of the decisions for CVM establishment from 2006.

Benchmarks for Romania
 Ensure a more transparent, and efficient judicial process notably by enhancing the capacity and accountability of the Superior Council of Magistracy. Report and monitor the impact of the new civil and penal procedures codes.
 Establish, as foreseen, an integrity agency with responsibilities for verifying assets, incompatibilities and potential conflicts of interest, and for issuing mandatory decisions on the basis of which dissuasive sanctions can be taken.
 Building on progress already made, continue to conduct professional, non-partisan investigations into allegations of high-level corruption.
 Take further measures to prevent and fight against corruption, in particular within the local government.

Benchmarks for Bulgaria
 Adopt constitutional amendments removing any ambiguity regarding the independence and accountability of the judicial system.
 Ensure a more transparent and efficient judicial process by adopting and implementing a new judicial system act and the new civil procedure code. Report on the impact of these new laws and of the penal and administrative procedure codes, notably on the pre-trial phase.
 Continue the reform of the judiciary in order to enhance professionalism, accountability and efficiency. Evaluate the impact of this reform and publish the results annually.
 Conduct and report on professional, non-partisan investigations into allegations of high-level corruption. Report on internal inspections of public institutions and on the publication of assets of high-level officials.
 Take further measures to prevent and fight corruption, in particular at the borders and within local government.
 Implement a strategy to fight organised crime, focussing on serious crime, money laundering as well as on the systematic confiscation of assets of criminals. Report on new and ongoing investigations, indictments and convictions in these areas.

Table

Current developments

Bulgaria
In January 2014, the European Commission issued a report on progress in Bulgaria in a very diplomatic language; without allocating specific guilt to any political party, government or person, Brussels stated that a lot must still be done.

Romania
In November 2022, the European Commission requested the lifting of CVM for Romania.

Future usage
More than three years have passed since the 2007 enlargement to Bulgaria and Romania, so as of 2014 no new safeguards can be invoked.

Croatia acceded to the European Union on 1 July 2013, but no safeguard clauses were invoked for it.

See also
 Enhanced co-operation
 Multi-speed Europe
 European integration

References

External links
 Mechanism for Cooperation and Verification for Bulgaria and Romania

Politics of the European Union